Tornado Studios is a video game company that is located in Tulsa, Oklahoma. It was staffed by veteran game designers from video game companies that include Square Enix, Ubisoft and Electronic Arts.

Project Runway The Video Game

The first game Tornado Studios released was Project Runway The Video Game. Based on the American reality television series Project Runway. The game was published by Atari and released for the Wii platform on March 2, 2010. 

In the last years Tornado Studios has been focusing on developing photorealistic 3D models for games, movies, presentations, architectural visualizations and designs. They are a team of 3D artists.

References

External links

Video game companies of the United States
Companies based in Tulsa, Oklahoma